Gracilia minuta is a species of beetles in the family Cerambycidae, the only species in the genus Gracilia.

References

Graciliini
Monotypic Cerambycidae genera